Clarence Russell McNutt, athlete
 Russell Alton McNutt, engineer and alleged spy